Ken Barrett may refer to:

 Ken Barrett (field hockey) (born 1963), American Olympic hockey player
 Ken Barrett (loyalist) (born 1963), Northern Irish former loyalist paramilitary
 Ken Barrett (English footballer) (1938–2015), English footballer
 Ken Barrett (Australian footballer) (born 1939), Australian rules footballer